The Department of Main Roads (DMR) was an agency of the New South Wales Government, responsible for planning, constructing and maintaining major road infrastructure. The DMR directly managed highways and major roads and provided funding to local councils for regional and local roads. The agency was merged with other agencies to form the Roads & Traffic Authority in 1989.

History

The Ministry of Transport was established in December 1932 by way of the Transport (Division of Functions) Act of 1932, following the dismissal of the Lang Government and the subsequent state election. The ministry consisted of three departments, including the Department of Main Roads and the Department of Road Transport & Tramways. The departments were established as the incoming Stevens Government and its Minister for Transport Michael Bruxner sought to reorganise the management of the road network in NSW. The new department essentially resumed the functions that had been held by the NSW Main Roads Board from 1925 until March 1932, when they were transferred to the Department of Transport by the Lang Government.

The Transport (Division of Functions) Act of 1932 provided for the appointment of a Commissioner of Main Roads who held the powers necessary to manage the major highways of the state. Hugh Hamilton Newell was appointed as the first Commissioner. The new Department also took over the management of the newly constructed Sydney Harbour Bridge from the Public Works Department.

In 1976 the responsibilities for managing traffic, including the operation of the traffic signal system, were transferred to the DMR from the Department of Motor Transport, which was a successor of Department of Road Transport and Tramways. Many specialist traffic management staff and traffic signal maintenance crews also became part of the DMR at this time.

Pursuant to the Transport Administration Act 1988, the DMR merged with the Traffic Authority of New South Wales and the Department of Motor Transport to form the Roads & Traffic Authority on 16 January 1989.

New South Wales Road Classification
When formed, the DMR was responsible for managing 26,321 km of the major roads in NSW. These were formally classified as:

 State Highways
 Trunk Roads
 Main Roads
 Secondary Roads
 Developmental Roads

By 1972 this network had grown to 43,292 km and by then also included some additional classifications:

 Freeways
 Tourist Roads
 Unclassified roads in the remote western parts of the State

Local roads continued to managed by local councils.

Organisation
The Department of Main Roads was headed by a Commissioner who was a statutory appointment by the Minister for Roads. The department employed salaried staff who carried out planning, management and administrative tasks and day labour staff who undertook road and bridge works.

For much of its existence the DMR undertook a significant proportion of its road and bridge construction and all its maintenance activities using its own labour force.  It also operated major mechanical workshops, asphalt plants, spray sealing crews, road linemarking teams and materials testing laboratories.

In 1932 the Department had a total employment of 2,425. By 1970, as tasks expanded, this number had grown to 11,497. In the later 1970s and through the 1980s successive waves of internal re-organisation led to more work being let out to contract with the total employment number dropping to 8,700 by the time the Department ceased to exist in 1989.

List of Commissioners of Main Roads

Notable employees
Ray Wedgwood

National Affiliations
The Department of Main Roads became a member of Conference of State Road Authorities (COSRA) when that organisation was formed in 1934 and then, from 1959, the National Association of Australian State Road Authorities (NAASRA). When NAASRA was transformed into Austroads in 1989 the DMR's successor the Roads & Traffic Authority became a foundation member.

Publication
From 1929 until 1984, Main Roads was the DMR's inhouse journal that was published quarterly.

References
 Aitkin, Don (1969). The Colonel: A political biography of Sir Michael Bruxner. Australian National University Press. .
Terry, Michael (1945). Bulldozer: the War Role of the Department of Main Roads, New South Wales. Frank Johnson, Sydney.

Notes

External links
History of Department of Main Roads - NSW State Archives & Records

Main Roads
Defunct transport organisations based in Australia
History of transport in New South Wales
1932 establishments in Australia
1989 disestablishments in Australia